John Holbrook Powers (1831–1918), who was known as "Honest John," was a Nebraska pioneer who ran for governor as a populist in 1892.  Mr. Powers was born in Madison County, Illinois, and served in the Union Army in the Civil War before moving to Nebraska.  In 1884, Powers joined the Farmers' Alliance and rose rapidly in the organization.  In 1892, he was nominated as the gubenarorial candidate of the People's Party, the political wing of the Alliance.  Of the three candidates, Powers received the most votes, but after a long and bitter fight, James E. Boyd, the Democrat, was declared elected.  In his History of Nebraska, James Olson described Powers as "a modest man who lived in a sod house on his homestead in Hitchcock County."(Page 222).

Robert B. Crosby, the Republican Governor of Nebraska from 1954 to 1955, was John Powers' great grandson.

Further reading
James C. Olson, History of Nebraska, Second Edition. (Lincoln, NE:  University of Nebraska Press, 1966).

Nebraska Populists
People from Madison County, Illinois
1831 births
1918 deaths
People from Hitchcock County, Nebraska
People of Illinois in the American Civil War